Rubble is a 20-volume collection of compilation albums featuring mostly late-1960s British psychedelic rock compiled by Bam-Caruso Records, St Albans, Herts, England by Phil Lloyd-Smee. 

The first volume was created in 1984, and the series was completed in 2002 (and later, the New Rubble series has begun).  Rubble is one of the first series of compilation albums of psychedelic rock, freakbeat, rhythm and blues, garage rock and beat music of the mid to late 1960s in the United Kingdom. It predated similar compilation series, such as the  English Freakbeat series, which AIP Records started in 1988.  

The name "Rubble" is influenced by the title of the seminal Nuggets double LP, and resembles the titles of several similar compilation series, such as the Pebbles series, Boulders series and Rough Diamonds series. Most of the bands on these albums were not commercially successful, such as the Glass Menagerie, The Onyx, Wonderland and Wild Silk. However, the albums also include a few better-known bands, such as Tomorrow, The Poets, The Pretty Things, The Spencer Davis Group and The Crazy World of Arthur Brown.

Discography
There are 20 volumes in the Rubble series:

The Psychedelic Snarl
Pop-Sike Pipe-Dreams
Nightmares in Wonderland
The 49-Minute Technicolor Dream
The Electric Crayon Set
The Clouds Have Groovy Faces
Pictures In the Sky (Rubble)
All the Colors of Darkness
Plastic Wilderness
Professor Jordan's Magic Sound Show
Adventures In the Mist
Staircase to Nowhere
Freak Beat Fantoms
The Magic Rocking Horse
5000 Seconds Over Toyland
Glass Orchid Aftermath
A Trip In a Painted World
Rainbow Thyme Wynders
Eiderdown Mindfog
Thrice Upon a Time (Nothing Is Real)

References

External links
http://www.marmalade-skies.co.uk/rubble.htm
http://www.myspace.com/rubbleonrandomrotation

Compilation album series
Psychedelic rock albums by British artists
Psychedelic rock compilation albums
1980s compilation albums
1990s compilation albums
2000s compilation albums